Safaa Jabbar, (born July 20, 1993) is an Iraqi professional footballer who currently plays for Naft Al-Janoob in the Iraqi Premier League. He plays as a  defender.

International debut
On October 3, 2015 Safaa Jabbar made his first international cap with Iraq against Jordan in a friendly match.

References

External links 
 
 

Iraqi footballers
1993 births
Living people
Iraq international footballers
Al-Mina'a SC players
Naft Al-Basra SC players
Najaf FC players
Association football fullbacks